Julie Gräbert (1803–1871), was a German theatre manager.

She succeeded her spouse as the manager of the popular theatre Vorstädtische Theater am Weinbergsweg in Berlin between 1855 and 1870, which was known as an innovative establishment during her tenure.

She is the subject of a Singspiel by Curth Flatow, Mutter Gräbert macht Theater.

References 

1803 births
1871 deaths
19th-century theatre managers
19th-century German businesswomen
19th-century German businesspeople